Zulfikar Haidar (19 November 1899 – 23 April 1987) was a Bangladeshi poet. For his Islamic writings, the Government of Pakistan gave him the title Sitara-e-Khidmat. He was also honored by the People's Republic of Bangladesh with the Ekushey Padak in 1978.

Early life
Haidar was born on 19 November 1899 at Bhaturia village in Comilla district (now Brahmanbaria) of the then East Bengal (now Bangladesh) to Mahammad Jamal and Chand Bibi. His father worked at the Land Record Department and his mother was a housewife. He started his primary education at Noor Nagar primary School. Before his Secondary School Certificate examination in 1917, he left home and went to Kolkata. There he joined British Army to fought in World War I and went to Mumbai for his training. After his training he was sent to Baghdad to fought the war. He returned to Kolkata after the war.

Awards and recognition
 Sitara-e-Khidmat
 Ekushey Padak (1978)
 Nazrul Memorial Award (1985)

References 

Bengali-language writers
1899 births
1987 deaths
20th-century Bangladeshi male writers
Recipients of the Ekushey Padak